The Salmon River arises in the Baird Mountains of the Brooks Range and flows  south to join the Kobuk River  southwest of its junction with the Tutksuk River. It is part of the National Wild and Scenic Rivers System and lies entirely within the Kobuk Valley National Park in Alaska.

References
 Orth, Donald (1967) Dictionary of Alaska Place Names Geological Survey professional paper, Volume 567. USGS. Government Printing Office, Washington.
 Officially Designated Rivers of the National Wild and Scenic River System in Alaska Alaska Public Lands Information Center.

Kobuk Valley National Park
Rivers of Northwest Arctic Borough, Alaska
Wild and Scenic Rivers of the United States
Rivers of Alaska